William Edward Relling Jr. (March 15, 1954 – January 22, 2004) was a St. Louis-born horror/mystery writer. He graduated from Lutheran High School North in 1971. He was a member of the Colin Sphinctor Band and in 1978 moved to Los Angeles with the band. When the band broke up, Relling chose to stay in Los Angeles, where he continued writing. Fellow writer Gary A. Braunbeck wrote of Relling's death by suicide in his 2010 book To Each Their Darkness.

Select bibliography
 Brujo (December 1986) TOR Paperback
 New Moon (October 1987) TOR Paperback
 The Infinite Man: A Collection of 21 Stories (1989) Scream Press
 Silent Moon (March 1990) TOR Paperback
 Deadly Vintage (1995) Walker & Co, Hardcover
 Sweet Poison (1998) Walker & Co. Hardcover
 Along the Midway of the Carnival of Souls, and Other Stories (Collection with Rick Hautala) (September 2002) Wildside Press H/C
 The Criminalist (November 2003) Leisure Paperback()

References

External links

1964 births
2004 suicides
Writers from St. Louis
American horror writers
20th-century American male writers
2004 deaths